"Xanadu" is the title song from the soundtrack of the 1980 film Xanadu. Written by Jeff Lynne of the English rock band Electric Light Orchestra (ELO), the song is performed by English-born Australian singer, songwriter and actress Olivia Newton-John, with Lynne adding parenthetic vocals in the style of his other songs on the Xanadu soundtrack, and ELO providing the instrumentation. It was Lynne's least favourite of his own songs. "Xanadu" reached number one in several countries and was the band's only UK number-one single, when it peaked there for two weeks in July 1980.  It was certified silver by the British Phonographic Industry. It also peaked at number eight on the US Billboard Hot 100.

Background 
"Xanadu" was written by Electric Light Orchestra's Jeff Lynne for the soundtrack of the musical film of the same name. It was sung by lead actress Olivia Newton-John as the character, Kira with instrumentation and vocals from ELO (including Lynne). "Xanadu", was released as a single by ELO and Newton-John in June 1980, which peaked at number one in several European countries, Austria, Belgium, Ireland, the Netherlands, Norway, Spain, United Kingdom and West Germany.

Reception

Billboard′s reviewer described the song as a "sizzling track", writing, "Essentially it's Olivia taking Jeff Lynne's usual spot as lead singer of ELO. The combination is a winning one."

Personnel
Olivia Newton-John – lead and backing vocals
Jeff Lynne – guitars, keyboards, backing vocals
Bev Bevan – drums, percussion
Richard Tandy – keyboards
Kelly Groucutt – bass guitar, backing vocals
James Newton Howard – synthesizers
Louis Clark – strings

Charts

Weekly charts

Year-end charts

Olivia featuring Paula version

In late 1995, two Australian dance performers released versions of the song. Sydney singer Olivia featuring Paula (on the MDS label) released a dance version first, followed by Kirsty K. (on Central Station Records). Both versions charted on the ARIA Singles and Dance Charts in the first half of 1996.

Charts

Kirsty K. version

Charts

New Electric Light Orchestra version
In 2000, ELO's Jeff Lynne re-recorded the song, with his own vocals, for the box set Flashback and the All Over the World compilation. Though it was billed as an ELO selection, the song was recorded by Lynne with Marc Mann on keyboards, but with no input from his former bandmates Richard Tandy, Bev Bevan, and Kelly Groucutt.

Sharleen Spiteri version

In 2009, Scottish singer-songwriter Sharleen Spiteri recorded the song for her second studio album titled The Movie Songbook which was released on 1 March 2010 worldwide. "Xanadu" was released as the lead single from the album in February 2010.

Charts

References

External links
In-depth Song Analysis at the Jeff Lynne Song Database (jefflynnesongs.com)

 

1980 songs
1980 singles
1995 singles
2010 singles
Olivia Newton-John songs
Electric Light Orchestra songs
Film theme songs
Song recordings produced by Jeff Lynne
Songs written by Jeff Lynne
Songs from Xanadu (film)
UK Singles Chart number-one singles
European Hot 100 Singles number-one singles
Number-one singles in Germany
Dutch Top 40 number-one singles
Number-one singles in Norway
Dannii Minogue songs
Sharleen Spiteri songs
Flamingokvintetten songs
Wizex songs
Ingmar Nordströms songs
MCA Records singles
Jet Records singles
Mercury Records singles
Universal Music Group singles